McNeil Morgan (born 18 October 1970) is a Vincentian cricketer. He played in 29 first-class and 14 List A matches for the Windward Islands from 1994 to 2002.

See also
 List of Windward Islands first-class cricketers

References

External links
 

1970 births
Living people
Saint Vincent and the Grenadines cricketers
Windward Islands cricketers